Dentumoger, or Dentü-Mogyer, is a legendary homeland of the Hungarians before their conquest of the Carpathian Basin around 895. This name is recorded by the anonymous author of the Gesta Hungarorum ("Deeds of the Hungarians") who identifies it with "Scythia". When using this term, "Anonymus" referred both to a territory and to its inhabitants. In Simon of Kéza's chronicle, Dentia and Mogoria are regions of Scythia.

Anonymus's report of the route taken by the Hungarians from Dentumoger towards present-day Hungary suggests that he placed it in the wider region of the middle course of the Volga River. On the other hand, the toponym is composed of two parts—Dentu which refers to the Don River, and moger which stands for the Magyar endonym of the Hungarians. Anonymus writes that the Hungarians westward migration from Dentumoger started "in the year of Our Lord's incarnation 884".

See also
Etelköz
Levedia

Footnotes

References 

Anonymus, Notary of King Béla: The Deeds of the Hungarians (Edited, Translated and Annotated by Martyn Rady and László Veszprémy) (2010). In: Rady, Martyn; Veszprémy, László; Bak, János M. (2010); Anonymus and Master Roger; CEU Press; .

Hungarian prehistory